Amlash County is in Gilan province, Iran. The capital of the county is the city of Amlash. At the 2006 census, the county's population was 46,108 in 13,222 households. The following census in 2011 counted 44,261 people in 14,191 households. At the 2016 census, the county's population was 43,225 in 15,306 households.

The area has given its name to the archeological objects from a suggested Amlash culture.

Administrative divisions

The population history of Amlash County's administrative divisions over three consecutive censuses is shown in the following table. The latest census shows two districts, five rural districts, and two cities.

References

 

Counties of Gilan Province